Claudia Cuesta is a Colombian artist based in Sechelt, British Columbia.

Education 
She obtained a MFA from the Slade School of Fine Art, University College of London where she studied with Rachel Whiteread, Marcus Taylor, and Melanie Counsell.

Exhibitions 
Since coming to Canada after studying in the UK in 1990, she has participated in several group exhibitions. Her installation Relic of Time (1987–88) and Symbolic Correspondence (1993) at the Toronto Power Plant 1993 exhibition Whiteness and Wounds addressed the issue of hurt and repair. At the Vancouver Art Gallery 1993 exhibition Out of Place, Cuesta contributed three installations--Attempting to Integrate (1986-1987), Life Perpetually Starting (1993), and Journey (1993)--that explored her self-reflexive journey to becoming an artist.

In 1998, Cuesta had a solo exhibition at the Vancouver Contemporary Art Gallery entitled CONFESSION (from a payphone). The exhibition centred on resolving personal, religious concerns, on acknowledging the Roman Catholic household in which she was raised and her current attitude towards the religion.

Public art works 
Cuesta collaborates with urban designer Bill Baker on a number of public projects under the name art.site.  Installations by Cuesta and Baker can be seen in various cities of the Greater Vancouver including: the city of Richmond, B.C., Surrey, B.C. and North Vancouver, B.C.

Awards 
Cuesta is the recipient of numerous Canada Council grants and a B. C. Cultural Fund Award. In 2011, Cuesta and Baker received the Public Award of Excellence for their public art installation Trees and Trail Markers in the city of North Vancouver.

References 

Year of birth missing (living people)
Living people
Colombian artists
Alumni of University College London
Canadian people of Colombian descent